Gyroscope is an action video game published by Melbourne House in 1985 for the Acorn Electron, Amstrad CPC, BBC Micro, Commodore 64, and ZX Spectrum. It is based on the Atari Games arcade title Marble Madness. Melbourne House would go on to publish the official ports of Marble Madness for the ZX Spectrum and Amstrad CPC, but these were not based on Gyrosope.

Gameplay
The gameplay is very similar to Marble Madness except the player controls a spinning gyroscope rather than a marble. The game is presented in isometric 3D. The player must guide the gyroscope from the top of the course to the bottom within an allotted time limit. If the gyroscope topples off the edge, a life is lost. Hazards on the course include potholes, aliens and glass slopes which cause the gyroscope to spin in random directions. There are five courses comprising four screens each. The gyroscope had to land on a marked square to complete each level.

Reception
Your Sinclair gave the game 9/10, praising the 3D graphics. It was also placed at number 77 in the Your Sinclair top 100.

Electron User gave it a score of 6/10, again praising the graphics but complaining of a number of bugs spoiling "what could be a very good game".

References

External links
 

1985 video games
Amstrad CPC games
BBC Micro and Acorn Electron games
Commodore 64 games
ZX Spectrum games
Action video games
Marble games
Video games developed in the United Kingdom
Video games with isometric graphics
Video game clones